Brugelette is a municipality of Wallonia located in the province of Hainaut, Belgium.

On January 1, 2006, Brugelette had a total population of 3,284.

The municipality consists of the following districts: Attre, Brugelette, Cambron-Casteau, Gages, and Mévergnies-lez-Lens.

See also
Attre Castle
Pairi Daiza (zoo and botanical garden)

References

External links 
 
 Official web site 

Municipalities of Hainaut (province)